The World Telecommunication Standardization Assembly (WTSA) is the governing conference of the ITU Standardization Sector (ITU-T), one of the three world conferences of the International Telecommunication Union, and as such, the United Nations system. The quadrennial conference decides the working methods for ITU-T for the next Study Period. It also creates the Telecommunication Standardization Advisory Group (TSAG) and the ITU-T Study Groups (such as ITU-T Study Group 16) and elects their management teams. The Recommendations and resolutions that are approved at WTSA shape the future of ICT standardization.

WTSA 20 
WTSA 20 was scheduled to be held in Hyderabad, India in 17-27 November 2020. It was rescheduled to 1-9 March 2022 at CICG, next to ITU headquarters in Geneva, Switzerland, due to the COVID-19 pandemic.

WTSA 16 
WTSA-16 was held from 25 October until 3 November 2016 in Hammamet, Tunisia.

WTSA 12 
The World Telecommunication Standardization Assembly in 2012 (WTSA 12) was held in the United Arab Emirates from 20 until 29 November.

References 

International Telecommunication Union